The 1902 Vermont Green and Gold football team was an American football team that represented  the University of Vermont as an independent during the 1902 college football season. In their first year under head coach Harry Howard Cloudman, the team compiled a 5–3–2 record.

Schedule

References

Vermont
Vermont Catamounts football seasons
Vermont Green and Gold football